Stefan Guzy (born 1980) is a German poster artist living in Berlin.

He graduated in visual communication at the Berlin University of the Arts in 2007, having studied with professors like Stefan Sagmeister and Daniela Haufe/Detlef Fiedler. The studio "Zwölf" which he founded 2001 with partner Björn Wiede is known for its typographical poster designs for indie rock artists like José González, William Fitzsimmons or Blonde Redhead, which received numerous international awards including "Best Poster 2007" (Art Directors Club), Certificate of Typographic Excellence (Type Directors Club) or AIGA Annual Design Award. His work has been exhibited at several poster biennials like Toyama (2009), Lahti (2009) and Tehran (2009) among others.

In 2011 he has been a selected member of the ADC 90th Annual Awards Design jury.

Together with his studio partner Björn Wiede he became a member of Alliance Graphique Internationale in 2016.

External links 
Zwölf (design studio)

References 

1980 births
Living people
German graphic designers
German typographers and type designers
German poster artists
Album-cover and concert-poster artists
Berlin University of the Arts alumni